Tropaeolum brideanum is a species of plant in the Tropaeolaceae family. It is endemic to Ecuador.  Its natural habitat is subtropical or tropical moist montane forests.

References

Endemic flora of Ecuador
brideanum
Vulnerable plants
Taxonomy articles created by Polbot